Stefano Umberto Tareno Mori  (born January 16, 1985) is a former actor with Filipino and Italian descent. He was also a former member of the band, JCS.

Musical career 

Mori was part of the boyband trio JCS, together with John Prats and Carlo Aquino, where he played rhythm guitars as well as provided vocals. The group was originally formed as a dance group by Star Magic for ABS-CBN'S variety show ASAP in 1999. The group launched their debut album in 2000.

Filmography

Television

Film

References

External links
 

Filipino male film actors
Filipino male television actors
20th-century Filipino male singers
Filipino people of Italian descent
Star Magic
Living people
1985 births
ABS-CBN personalities
Star Music artists